is an airport located  east of Miyake village on the island of Miyakejima in the Miyake Subprefecture Tokyo, Japan.

In the past, flights from Haneda Airport were suspended as the area contained high sulfuric gas concentration from the July 14, 2000 volcanic eruption. Flights have resumed during April 2008, after sulfuric gases in the air have dropped to levels below 0.2ppm. There is also a helicopter that arrives via Izu Ōshima.

Airlines and destinations

References

Airports in Tokyo
Transport in the Greater Tokyo Area
Izu Islands